The Finlander Rugby Club is a men's division III rugby club in Apple Valley, California, currently playing in the SCRFU. Their games are held at Mendel Park.

References

External links
 Finlander Rugby Club

Rugby union teams in California
Sports in San Bernardino County, California